R. M. Anderson may refer to:
 Rudolph Martin Anderson (1876–1961), Canadian zoologist and explorer
 Robert M. Anderson (disambiguation)